The Metropolitan Archbishop of Thrissur is the chief bishop and principal leader of the nearly half a million Syro Malabar Catholics now used to be the largest catholic diocese in India, when it included the Syro-Malabar Catholic Archdiocese of Thrissur, Syro-Malabar Catholic Diocese of Irinjalakuda, Syro-Malabar Catholic Diocese of Palghat and Syro-Malabar Catholic Diocese of Ramanathapuram. He is also the Archbishop of Syro-Malabar Catholic Archdiocese of Thrissur. The title is more powerful as he is the custodian of St. Thomas Church (Palayur), where Christianity came to Indian sub-continent, and have two blessed people, Maria Theresa Chiramel and Euphrasia Eluvathingal in the Archdiocese.

Politics

The Archbishop of Thrissur has been a vocal supporter of Christian politicians in Thrissur District and Kerala for a long time. But it has been staunch critic against the Communist Party of India and its policies in Kerala after India's Independence. Later in this decade, the archbishop has emerged as an influential pressure group in Kerala politics by deciding seats from Kerala Legislature constituencies to India's upper house, Lok Sabha. Thrissur District's assembly constituencies like Ollur Assembly Constituency, Pudukad Assembly Constituency, Manalur Assembly Constituency, Thrissur Assembly Constituency and Irinjalakuda Assembly Constituency have a majority Christian population, which elect representatives to Kerala Legislature. Thrissur Lok Sabha constituency, one of the 20 Lok Sabha constituencies in Kerala, is also in Thrissur District.

The trend started when Mar Joseph Kundukulam, the first Archbishop of Thrissur, started friendship with the late former Chief Minister of Kerala, K. Karunakaran. It is alleged that archdiocese supported K. Karunakaran in his candidacy to the Kerala Legislature. This was the start of the bonding between Indian National Congress and the Syro-Malabar Catholic Archdiocese of Thrissur.
 After the death of Kundukulam, Mar Jacob Thoomkuzhy was elected as the next archbishop. But Thoomkuzhy was less interested in the Kerala politics. Later Mar Andrews Thazhath was selected to head the archdiocese. In 2007, he campaigned against Kerala Chief Minister V.S. Achuthanandan ruled Government against its policies towards Church and its institutions. He even threatened Communist-led Government telling that the Church may re-enact the "Liberation Struggle" of the late 1950s.

Oommen Chandy Ministry
The relations between Oommen Chandy Ministry and Andrews Thazhath was not cordial. The trouble started when Indian National Congress and Kerala Congress decided to field P. C. Chacko for Thrissur Lok Sabha constituency in the 2014 Indian general election. The Metropolitan Archbishop of Thrissur was not happy with P. C. Chacko as his performance was very low in earlier terms and he was an outsider from Thrissur District. In 1991, P. C. Chacko won the Thrissur Lok Sabha constituency but ran away from the constituency fearing backlash. In 2009, Indian National Congress forced Metropolitan Archbishop of Thrissur to accept P. C. Chacko as the candidate. But in 2014, the Metropolitan Archbishop of Thrissur was enraged by the decision of Indian National Congress to field P. C. Chacko from Thrissur Lok Sabha constituency as it was looking for a person from Thrissur District and his lack of interest in the development of Thrissur. Even P. C. Chacko decorated high offices like Indian National Congress national spokesman and Chairman of the Joint Parliamentary Committee, he never thought about the development of Thrissur. Later on, K. P. Dhanapalan MP from Chalakudy (Lok Sabha constituency) was fielded from the Thrissur Lok Sabha constituency.

List of Bishops and Archbishops of Thrissur

References

Archdiocese of Thrissur
Archbishops of Thrissur
Organizations with year of establishment missing